Glumilino is a rural locality (a village) in Taptykovsky Selsoviet, Ufimsky District, Bashkortostan, Russia. The population was 64 as of 2010. There are 7 streets.

Geography 
Glumilino is located 32 km southwest of Ufa (the district's administrative centre) by road. Lekarevka is the nearest rural locality.

References 

Rural localities in Ufimsky District